Thomas Piermayr (born 2 August 1989) is an Austrian footballer who plays for SC Wiener Neustadt.

Career

Piermayr started his career in 2008 with LASK Linz, for whom he played 78 games as a defender. He then signed for a one-year deal with Inverness in July 2011, after impressing manager Terry Butcher during the preseason. He left Inverness at the end of the season and signed for Wiener Neustadt. On 9 July 2013 he signed a contract with Lillestrøm out the season.

He has also represented the Austria national under-21 football team.

Career statistics

References

External links

LASK Linz profile

1989 births
Living people
Austrian footballers
Austria under-21 international footballers
Association football fullbacks
LASK players
Inverness Caledonian Thistle F.C. players
SC Wiener Neustadt players
Lillestrøm SK players
Colorado Rapids players
FC Minsk players
Békéscsaba 1912 Előre footballers
Scottish Premier League players
Austrian Football Bundesliga players
Eliteserien players
Major League Soccer players
Allsvenskan players
Belarusian Premier League players
Nemzeti Bajnokság I players
Cypriot Second Division players
Austrian expatriate footballers
Expatriate footballers in Scotland
Expatriate footballers in Norway
Expatriate footballers in Belarus
Expatriate footballers in Hungary
Expatriate footballers in Cyprus
Expatriate soccer players in the United States
Association football defenders
Expatriate footballers in Sweden
AFC Eskilstuna players
FC Juniors OÖ players
Olympiakos Nicosia players